Klaus Ehl (born 16 August 1949 in Paderborn) is a German former athlete who competed mainly in the 100 metres.

Biography
Born in Paderborn, he competed for West Germany in the 1972 Summer Olympics held in Munich, Germany in the 4 x 100 metre relay where he won the bronze medal with his team mates Jobst Hirscht, Karlheinz Klotz and Gerhard Wucherer.

References

Sports Reference

1949 births
Living people
Sportspeople from Paderborn
West German male sprinters
Olympic bronze medalists for West Germany
Athletes (track and field) at the 1972 Summer Olympics
Olympic athletes of West Germany
Medalists at the 1972 Summer Olympics
Olympic bronze medalists in athletics (track and field)
Universiade medalists in athletics (track and field)
Universiade bronze medalists for West Germany